Walter Partsch (1923–2001) was an Austrian cinematographer.

Selected filmography
 The House on the Coast (1954)
 Don't Worry About Your Mother-in-Law (1954)
 Father's Day (1955)
 The Doctor's Secret (1955)
 The Poacher of the Silver Wood (1957)
 Candidates for Marriage (1958)
 The Street (1958)
 Sebastian Kneipp (1958)
 Endangered Girls (1958)
 My Daughter Patricia (1959)
 I'm Marrying the Director (1960)
 Der rote Rausch (1962)
 Mario (1963, TV series)

References

Bibliography 
 Fritsche, Maria. Homemade Men In Postwar Austrian Cinema: Nationhood, Genre and Masculinity . Berghahn Books, 2013.
 Von Dassanowsky, Robert . Austrian Cinema: A History. McFarland, 2005.

External links 
 

1923 births
2001 deaths
Austrian cinematographers
Film people from Vienna